The 2010 Carolina Railhawks FC season is the fourth season of the franchise due to be played in the USSF Division 2 Pro League.

Conference table

Players

Transfers
OUT

IN: Tommy Heinemann (loan from Charleston Battery, Sept-Oct 2010); Claudio Suárez (exhibition guest appearance 9/5/2010); Allan Russell (7/23/2010); Ty Shipalane (6/1/2010); David Hayes (5/12/2010)

Match results

Preseason

USSF Division 2 Professional League Regular Season

2010 U.S. Open Cup

Playoffs

Quarterfinals

RailHawks advance 4-0 on aggregate

Semifinals

RailHawks advance 2-1 on aggregate.

Mid-season friendlies

North Carolina FC seasons
Carolina RailHawks
USSF Division 2 Professional League
Carolina Railhawks